Bald Eagle-Nittany High School was a public high school in Mill Hall, Pennsylvania.  After the high school closed, the building was renovated and is now Central Mountain Middle School.

Overview
Bald Eagle-Nittany High School first opened for the 1955-56 school year. Its name originates from the area where its students lived; from both valleys of Mount Nittany and Bald Eagle Mountain. The student body came from Mill Hall, Beech Creek, Pennsylvania, Lamar Township, Pennsylvania, Porter Township, Pennsylvania, and Bald Eagle Township, Pennsylvania. In 1999, after already being joined by the majority of the Sugar Valley High School students two years earlier, Bald Eagle-Nittany merged with Lock Haven High School and the three schools formed Central Mountain High School. After the merger, events such as the homecoming celebration mentioned were lost, along with the rivalry between these schools. Central Mountain students now have their own traditions.

Athletics
Contributions were made through funds raised from the athletic clubs.

Wrestling
The Panther grapplers turned out a record of 450-221-11 over the school's forty-three years earning a .670 win percentage.

Coach George Custer coached seven wrestlers to twelve District 6 individual titles, three wrestlers to four state titles and also had two runners-up. Coach Custer was inducted into the Pennsylvania Wrestling Association Coaches Hall of Fame in 1973.

After Coach Custer, Coach Charles "Biff" Walizer headed the program for the next 25 years, amassing a 294-155-6 mark and ten District 6 titles, winning six straight at the end of his career. Coach Walizer coached thirty-two individual champions to fifty-two total titles at the District 6 tournament.  He also coached four individual champions to eight state-level titles with six runners-up.  Coach Walizer was inducted into the Pennsylvania Wrestling Association Coaches Hall of Fame in 2003.

Along with these coaches, the following associates of the Bald Eagle-Nittany wrestling program have also been inducted into the Pennsylvania Wrestling Association Coaches Hall of Fame: Terry Williams - 1991 (wrestler), Norm Polovcsik - 1999 (Editor), and Frank Eisenhower - 2004 (Wrestler).

Bald Eagle-Nittany wrestling in District 6 earned twelve tournament titles and three duals titles.  The Panthers also had seventy-five champions. The program also had eight members in the District 6 hall of fame; George Custer (inducted 1990), Terry Williams (1992), Frank Eisenhower (1998), Charles "Biff" Walizer (2000), Barry Daniels (2003), Scott Bair (2006), Travis "Trap" McCormick (2006), and Biff Walizer (2006).

While wrestling at the regional level the program secured twenty-six champions, several of them earned honors as Pennsylvania Interscholastic Athletic Association state wrestling champions.  Bald Eagle-Nittany wrestling state champions and runners-up are:

                    Champions                             Runners-up
     Frank Eisenhower          145 lbs. 1959     Karl Galbraith 165 lbs. 1963
     Frank Eisenhower          154 lbs. 1960     Barry Daniels  127 lbs. 1966
     Adam Waltz                138 lbs. 1962     Mark Williams  119 lbs. 1975
     Barry Daniels             133 lbs. 1967     Mark Williams  126 lbs. 1976
     Dusty Ream                138 lbs. 1974     Terry Williams 155 lbs. 1979
     Terry Williams            155 lbs. 1977     Casey Koch     119 lbs. 1987
     Terry Williams            155 lbs. 1978     Casey Koch     125 lbs. 1989
     Terry Williams            155 lbs. 1980     Shan Rippey    135 lbs. 1991
     Biff Walizer              125 lbs. 1992     Shawn Weaver   189 lbs. 1997
     Biff Walizer              125 lbs. 1993
     Scott Bair                119 lbs. 1995
     Scott Bair                125 lbs. 1996
    *Travis "Trap" McCormick   112 lbs. 1997
    +Andy Hull                 160 lbs. 1999

 * Also won titles in 1995 and 1996 while wrestling for the Sugar Valley Indians at 103 lbs.
 + Last wrestling match in a Bald Eagle-Nittany singlet.

Track and Field 
Although Bald Eagle Nittany never had a track & field team or cross country team, Glenn Stephens coached himself and competed as a middle and long distance runner in open road races, Nittany Valley Track Club cross country, marathons, and all comers track meets, as an exhibition runner in Lock High High School track meets, and Jersey Shore High School cross country races. Stephens ran the first of several marathons as a sophomore, won the Class B division of the Camptown races as a junior, placed 3rd in Districts (and broke the District record) in the 880 as a junior, and won the West Branch conference 880 as a senior, breaking the Conference record.  In his senior year, Stephens lost one track race and was awarded an honorary letter.

Noted alumni
Howard M. Peters (class of 1958), Silicon Valley (of California) patent attorney, nat. American Chemical Society Board of Directors, 2005-7  
 Glenn Stephens (class of 1976), competed for BEN and Millersville University in track and cross country, but later moved into triathlon and aquabike (swim-bike).  Ranked 4th in the United States in his age group in the aquabike division in 2010.  UCLA Ph.D. in Political Science, UC Berkeley Boalt Hall School of Law J.D., former senior counsel to current NLRB Chair Wilma Liebma. Has taught at California State University, Northridge, Pomona College, UCLA, Princeton University, Scripps College, and Penn State.  Blogger - https://ikonoklazt.wordpress.
 Alison Bechdel (class of 1978), American cartoonist; originally best known for the long-running comic strip Dykes To Watch Out For, in 2006 she became a best-selling author with her graphic memoir Fun Home. 
 Tym Desanto - (class of 1977), Tim (Tym) has enjoyed success as an athlete, artist, designer, and television personality. Desanto is the current host of Style File.

See also
Central Mountain High School

References

External links
Pennsylvania System of School Assessment 1995-1996
Bald Eagle-Nittany wrestling program - District 6 History
Pennsylvania state wrestling championships and past champions
Pennsylvania Wrestling Coaches Association
Pennsylvania Interscholastic Athletic Association

High schools in Central Pennsylvania
Defunct schools in Pennsylvania
1955 establishments in Pennsylvania